Palmer Independent School District is a public school district based in Palmer, Texas (USA).

In 2009, the school district was rated "academically acceptable" by the Texas Education Agency.

Schools
Palmer ISD operates three campuses 
Palmer High School
Palmer Middle School
Palmer Elementary School

References

External links
Palmer ISD

School districts in Ellis County, Texas